Smithers Lake is an artificial impoundment in Fort Bend County, Texas, collecting water from Dry Creek.

The project is owned and operated by NRG Energy as the cooling-water supply for the WA Parish Generating Station. It was previously owned by the Houston Lighting and Power Company. Construction was started on August 22, 1956, and was completed on July 1, 1957. Water had already been impounded in a small lake, and the date for beginning of impoundment in the new lake was October 15, 1957.

References

Bodies of water of Fort Bend County, Texas
Lakes of Texas